Kharzar (also Romanized as Khārzār; also known as Kalāteh-ye Morād and Khār Zād) is a village in Qalandarabad Rural District, Qalandarabad District, Fariman County, Razavi Khorasan Province, Iran. At the 2006 census, its population was 50, in 13 families.

References 

Populated places in Fariman County